Pink Season is a studio album by Japanese musician George Miller, also known as Joji, Pink Guy, or Filthy Frank. It may also refer to:

 Pink Season (Apink album), the debut album by the South Korean girl group Apink
 Pink Season: The Prophecy, an EP by Filthy Frank remixing some of the songs from the album Pink Season